This article is partially translated from the Italian Wikipedia.

Giacomo Conti (2 November 1813, in Messina – 9 April 1888, in Florence) was an Italian painter, active in Messina, Rome, Siena, and Florence. His paintings include sacred subjects. He trained under Francesco Podesti.

1813 births
1888 deaths
19th-century Italian painters
Italian male painters
Painters from Messina
19th-century Italian male artists